Edward Campion, Sr. (December 19, 1915 – January 10, 2005) was an American basketball player in the United States National Basketball League (NBL). Born and raised in the Chicago area, Campion was an All-American college player for DePaul University in the 1936–37 season. He was also an alternate for the 1936 U.S. Olympic team. Following his college career, Campion played two seasons in the NBL for the Whiting Ciesar All-Americans (who became the Hammond Ciesar All-Americans during his time there), averaging 3.6 points per game. Campion died on January 10, 2005, in Salinas, California.

References

External links
NBL stats at basketball-reference.com

1915 births
2005 deaths
All-American college men's basketball players
Basketball players from Chicago
DePaul Blue Demons men's basketball players
Guards (basketball)
Hammond Ciesar All-Americans players
Whiting Ciesar All-Americans players
American men's basketball players